George Birch (died 1632) was an English politician.

He was Sheriff of Norwich in 1604, and became Mayor of Norwich in 1621.  He was a grocer and apothecary, and was married.

References

16th-century births
1632 deaths
Year of birth unknown
16th-century English people
17th-century English people
Sheriffs of Norwich
Mayors of Norwich
Politicians from Norwich